A Man of Iron (also known as  The Iron Man) is a 1925 American silent drama film produced and directed by Whitman Bennett and distributed through Chadwick Pictures. The film starred Lionel Barrymore.

Plot
As described in a film magazine review, Philip Durban marries Claire Bowdoin, a spoiled daughter of an improvised society matron. Their marriage as such is in name only. Claire loves Prince Novakian, a worthless fortune hunter. Within a year, Claire comes to love her husband, but he resents her advances. Ill, Claire goes to Italy for a rest. Once there, the Prince annoys her with his advances, so she sends for her husband. Arriving in Italy, Philip strikes the Prince, who challenges him to a duel. The Prince is killed and, with this cloud removed, Philip and Claire have a life of sunshine.

Cast

Preservation
With no prints of A Man of Iron located in any film archives, it is a lost film.

See also
List of lost films
Lionel Barrymore filmography

References

External links

Original lantern slide A Man of Iron

1925 films
American silent feature films
Lost American films
1925 drama films
Silent American drama films
American black-and-white films
Films directed by Whitman Bennett
1925 lost films
Lost drama films
1920s American films